Nowosiółki  (Novosilky) is a village in the administrative district of Gmina Baligród, within Lesko County, Subcarpathian Voivodeship, in south-eastern Poland.

The village has a population of 350.

References

Villages in Lesko County